Sowin' Love is the second studio album by American country music artist Paul Overstreet. The album was released by RCA Nashville in 1989 (see 1989 in country music). The album reached #13 on Billboard's Top Country Albums chart and charted at #31 on the Top Christian Albums chart. This album produced five top ten singles.

Track listing

Charts

Weekly charts

Year-end charts

References

1989 albums
Paul Overstreet albums
Albums produced by James Stroud
RCA Records albums